Paraf, in Iran, may refer to:
 Paraf-e Bala
 Paraf-e Pain